Peninah Nthenya Musyimi (born December 1978) is a Kenyan lawyer activist, who established the 'Safe Spaces' project, to empower young women who were growing up in the slums of Nairobi. The project draws on her own life experience as the first person from her neighbourhood in the Mathare Valley to graduate from university. In 2011 she was the recipient of Care International's "I am Powerful" award.

Life

Musyimi was born in December 1978 in the area of Nairobi known as Mathare Valley. Her family were poor and lived in a house without a toilet, so she worked for her neighbours for cash  payment. Drink, drugs and prostitution are common sights in Mathare Valley, which affect the ability of young people from there to access education.

Nevertheless, Musyimi managed to start primary education, although she had no uniform or shoes, and became a good student. However it was unlikely that she would be able to attend secondary school. Despite setbacks, she did manage to arrange funding, walking  to school every day. Musyimi wanted to go on to university, but this was without precedent for a girl from her background, plus her father wanted her to get married.

One route to a university education that was open to Musyimi was the possibility of a scholarship based on ability at basketball. However there were few sports facilities where she lived. There was a basketball court at a church and she persuaded a basketball player there to teach her. She told her trainer that once she had the skills then she could create a team at the church. With intensive training, she passed the basketball trials and obtained a $400 scholarship to attend the University of Nairobi, where she studied Law and Social Science. She was the first woman from the Mathare Valley slum to graduate from university.

After graduation Musyimi trained as a lawyer, but recognised there was further activism that she could undertake. In 2008 she established "Safe Spaces" with funds from Schools without Borders and the Dutch embassy. The aim of the organisation is to increase the confidence and opportunities for girls in Nairobi. The project encourages girls to have ambitions and supplies funding to support secondary and university education. It also teaches girls how to be mechanics. It began with an initial meeting in her home with a small group of teenagers, where they discussed how women were "treated like trash".

Awards and recognition 
In 2011 she was given that year's "I am Powerful" award by CARE on the 100th anniversary of International Women's Day. She went to Washington to receive the award.

In 2014 she delivered a TEDx talk about her story titled "I am the Change" in Amsterdam. As of February 2022, it has been viewed 10,000 times. In 2019 she was invited to Amsterdam where she spoke about emancipation at the opening of a symposium. She spoke at the Cobra Museum in aid of International Women's Day.

References

1978 births
Living people
People from Nairobi
Kenyan women lawyers
Kenyan women activists